Juan Patiño may refer to:

 Juan Carlos Patino-Arango, American Roman Catholic seminarian accused of child molestation
 Juan Patiño (footballer, born 1989), Paraguayan football centre-back
 Juan Patiño (footballer, born 2001), Colombian football winger